Patrick Browne (12 September 1906 – 19 February 1991) was an Irish Fianna Fáil politician and publican. Born in Kilmeaden, County Waterford, he was elected to Dáil Éireann as a Fianna Fáil Teachta Dála (TD) for the Waterford constituency at the 1966 by-election caused by the death of Thaddeus Lynch of Fine Gael. He was re-elected at the 1969 general election but lost his seat at the 1973 general election. 

In the following Seanad election, he was elected to 13th Seanad on the Industrial and Commercial Panel where served until 1977.

References

1906 births
1991 deaths
Fianna Fáil TDs
Members of the 18th Dáil
Members of the 19th Dáil
Members of the 13th Seanad
Politicians from County Waterford
Fianna Fáil senators